Blue Sea is a municipality in the Outaouais region of Quebec, Canada, and part of La Vallée-de-la-Gatineau Regional County Municipality. It encompasses the southern portion of Blue Sea Lake.

The village of Blue Sea is located at the extreme southern end of Blue Sea Lake, north of the larger city of Gracefield and south of Maniwaki.

History
The Gauthier, Courchesne, Beaudoin, Lacroix, Tremblay, Fortin and Bénard were among the first European families to settle at the lake since the late nineteenth century. Almost at the same time, led by the construction of railways, the first vacationers established on the shores of the lake as well.

In 1921, the small location was first called Bouchette-South, then renamed to Blue Sea in 1931.

With the growth of tourism in the early 1940s, Blue Sea quickly became an attractive destination, which it has remained today.

Demographics

Dwellings (2021):
Total private dwellings: 639
Private dwellings occupied by usual residents: 359

Languages:
 English as first language: 6.6%
 French as first language: 93.4%

References

External links

Blue Sea Lake community website
Blue Sea page at MRC de La Vallée-de-la-Gatineau website

Incorporated places in Outaouais
Municipalities in Quebec